Kamal may refer to:

Kamal (name), a male given name and surname with multiple origins
Kamal (navigation), a navigational instrument for measuring latitude
Kamal, Jhapa, a rural municipality in Nepal
Alfa Romeo Kamal, an SUV by Alfa Romeo
Operation Kamala, name given to corrupt political practices by BJP in India

See also
Kamala (disambiguation)
Kamahl, Australian Malaysian singer